Heléne of the North is a lost 1915 silent film romantic drama directed by J. Searle Dawley and starring Marguerite Clark, Elliott Dexter and Conway Tearle. Adolph Zukor produced.

Cast
Marguerite Clark - Heléne Dearing
Conway Tearle - Ralph Connell, a.k.a. Lord Traverse
Elliott Dexter - Pierre
Robert Rogers - Captain Westforth
Kathryn Adams - Miss Cadwell
Frank Losee - John Dearing
David Wall - Father Duvall
Ida Darling - Mrs. O'Neill
Theodore Guise - Colonel O'Neill
James Kearney - Philip Brookes
Brigham Royce - Wild Buffalo
Eleanor Flowers - Whispering Grass

References

External links

1915 films
American silent feature films
Lost American films
Films directed by J. Searle Dawley
Paramount Pictures films
1915 romantic drama films
American romantic drama films
American black-and-white films
1910s American films
Silent romantic drama films
Silent American drama films